Gonjan (also Romanized as Gonjān and Ganjān) is a village in Siyah Banuiyeh Rural District, in the Central District of Rabor County, Kerman Province, Iran. At the 2006 census, its population was 1,428, in 360 families.

References 

Populated places in Rabor County